The 2002–03 Japan Figure Skating Championships were the 71st edition of the event. They were held between December 19 and 22, 2002 at the Kyoto Aquarena in Kyoto. Skaters competed in the disciplines of men's singles, ladies' singles, pair skating, and ice dancing. This event was used to determine the teams for the 2003 World Championships and the 2003 Four Continents Championships. The level of competition is Senior-level only. Juniors compete at the Japan Junior Figure Skating Championships, where the top three advance to the 2003 World Junior Championships.

Results

Men

Ladies

Pairs

Ice dancing

External links
 2002–03 Japan Figure Skating Championships results

Japan Figure Skating Championships
2002 in figure skating
2003 in figure skating
Sport in Kyoto
2002 in Japanese sport